The Ashura protests were a series of protests which occurred on 27 December 2009 in Iran against the outcome of the June 2009 Iranian presidential election, which demonstrators claim was rigged. The demonstrations were part of the 2009 Iranian election protests and were the largest since June. In December 2009, the protests saw an escalation in violence.

In response to this protest, pro-government protesters held a rally in a "show of force" three days later on 30 December (9 Dey) to condemn Green Movement protesters.

Background
Irregularities during the 2009 Iranian presidential election caused resentment among many Iranians. While post-election protests were mostly peaceful, some violence erupted, leading to clashes between security forces and protesters, while some outspoken political dissenters were detained.

However, dissenters continued to speak out against the government, leading to further protests in December 2009. On 19 December 2009, the Grand Ayatollah Hossein Ali Montazeri, who had become a "spiritual leader" of the opposition, died. Montazeri's funeral, held on 21 December in the city of Qom, was attended by a large gathering of people and clashes ensued between security forces and mourners, leading on to further demonstrations in Qom and Isfahan. On 26 December, a paramilitary Basij force subordinate to the Iranian Revolutionary Guard stormed a mosque in Tehran where scholar and former President Mohammad Khatami was speaking. This was followed by continued clashes in Tehran in which Jaras, a news media of the critics, estimated eight to ten people had died.

Prior to Ashura, Mohsen Kadivar said he could not "rule out the possibility" of state intervention in the planned protests.

Events

Protests

On 27 December, demonstrations in several cities continued into the holy day of Ashura the climax of Muharram, the month of mourning. Protesters in Tehran gathered "From Imam Hussain Square to Freedom Square", "from east to west along Revolution Street", and it was on this day that "the political and religious symbology of Iran's Islamic regime was turned on its head". The protesters made another symbolic move- a "symbolic journey from a square named after its most revered hero toward a monument dedicated to freedom, along a street called Revolution."

Seyed Ali Mousavi, the 35-year-old nephew of Mir-Hossein Mousavi, was among those killed in the violence. Later, it was reported that his body had disappeared, precluding the possibility of a quick burial, while state sources indicated that an autopsy was being performed. Mousavi was buried on 30 December.

Similar protests took place in other Iranian cities including Isfahan, Najafabad, Shiraz, Mashhad, Arak, Tabriz, Babol, Ardabil and Orumieh. Four people were reportedly killed in Tabriz, in north western Iran on 27 December, and one in Shiraz in the south of Iran. Access for international news media has been severely restricted by the Iranian government.

State controlled media initially denied any deaths, though it was indicated on 28 December that 15 had died, including ten "well-known anti-revolutionary terrorists". According to the official news agency of the Islamic Republic of Iran, Tehran's Safety Services said that "Nine residential buildings, 9 vehicles, 7 shops, 2 banks and 3 power stations were set on fire [by anti-government protesters]." On 30 December, counter-rallies staged and organized by the government at various cities, including Tehran, Qom, Arak, Shiraz and Isfahan called for the death of the protesters, with government workers receiving the day off work in order to attend the demonstrations.

Violence 
Lolagar mosque in Tehran was set into fire by the "rioters", according to the State TV of Iran leading to death of "few" people in mosque. Security forces allegedly opened fire on the day of Ashura, the Shiite holy day "symbolically about justice", a day on which any kind of violence is forbidden. Security forces initially denied reports of deaths and the police chief, Azizollah Rajabzadeh, stated that the police had not been armed, however, state television later acknowledged fatalities. Although official sources in Iran denied involvement of security forces in killing of protesters, at least one amateur video shows, the security truck which was deliberately running over the protesters. Other evidence says that security forces were armed with guns and shot at protesters, including one amateur video showing a plainclothes security force directly shooting at protesters.

Vandalism was reported by the Iranian government, with Tehran's Safety Services saying that "Nine residential buildings, 9 vehicles, 7 shops, 2 banks and 3 power stations were set on fire."

Arrests
Among the hundreds of people arrested in the aftermath of the Ashura demonstrations area are prominent lawyers, journalists, clerics and politicians, as well as family members of prominent human rights activists and reformist politicians. Some notable people arrested in the aftermath of the protests include:
Ebrahim Yazdi, the Secretary-General of the Freedom Movement of Iran. Yazdi's niece Leila Tavassoli was reportedly arrested as well.
A number of top Mousavi aides, including Alireza Beheshti, the managing editor of Mousavi's official site; Ghorban Behzadian-Nejad, Mousavi's campaign manager; Mohammad Bagherian; and Ali Forouzandeh, Mousavi's Chief of Staff. Mousavi's brother-in-law, Shahpour Kazemi, was also arrested.
Nobel Peace Prize laureate Shirin Ebadi's sister Noushin Ebadi, who was detained in an apparent effort to silence Ebadi who is abroad. Shirin Ebadi wrote in a statement following her sister's arrest: "It is important to note that my sister is not politically active nor is she a member of any human right organization. Her only crime seems to be that she is my sister and her arrest is nothing less than a political blackmail and attempted pressure. This is another method employed by the authorities in Iran to stop my activities."
Heshmat Tabarzadi, an Iranian journalist and veteran democratic activist.
Emad Baghi, a prominent human rights activist and journalist, and head of the Society for the Defense of the Rights of the Imprisoned. Baghi reportedly told his family as he was being arrested that "he would be strong in jail, and resist pressure [by hardliners]." The officer arresting him responded: "He [Baghi] will not live that long to resist."
Journalists Mashallah Shamsolvaezin, Reza al-Basha, Badralsadat Mofidi, Mohammad Javad Saberi, Nasrin Vaziri, Kayvan Mehrgan, Reza Tajik, Mostafa Izadi, and Morteza Kazemian.
Morteza Haji, a former government minister and a Khatami aide, as well as Haji's deputy Reza Rasouli. Hasan Rasool, a Khatami aide and the deputy director of the Baran Institute, was also arrested.
Political activists Mostafa Ezedi, Mohammad Reza Taheri, and Heshmatollah Tabari.
Mehdi Arabshahi, Secretary General of the Office for Consolidation of Unity, the most important organization for university students in Iran, and Rashid Esmaili, who is a member of the central committee of the Office for Consolidation of Unity.
Zahra Bahrami, a Dutch and Iranian dual citizen, who was executed in January 2011 on drugs charges

Analysis

According to Ibrahim Moussawi, associate professor of Lebanese University and head of Hizbullah's media relations, the incident damaged "public relations" of the Green Movement with Iranian citizenry more than all events as the acts of the protesters on that day including "applauding, whistling, and engaging in other cheerful displays," was "widely" seen as violation of a "red line" and targeting Husayn ibn Ali and Ashura commemoration itself. Various society groups including "marej-'e taqlid, the society of Iranian doctors, university student groups, the Iranian Parliament, Oil Industry Workers, the Iranian Women's Culture and Education Society, the Society of Iranian Teachers, the Iranian Professors Society, provincial governors and municipalities and bazaars" expressed their condemnation and many of them publicly asked for the "prosecution of the opposition leaders".

Trials
Many people are set to stand trial for taking part in the protests. At least one person arrested in connection with the protest, a university lecturer Abdolreza Ghanbari living in Pakdasht, has been accused of "moharebeh," (an Islamic term meaning "warring against God") and sentenced to death.

International reaction
The governments of Canada, France, Germany, the United Kingdom and the United States are among those who have condemned the violence. US President Barack Obama openly criticized the Iranian government's violent crackdown on the protests in a speech and declared "The decision of Iran's leaders to govern through fear and tyranny will not continue." Russia's Foreign Ministry expressed concern at the violence. It encouraged "a compromise on the basis of the law, and also to take political efforts to prevent a further escalation of the confrontation."

Venezuela condemned what it called Western governments' interference in Iran's internal affairs.

Slogans
Since the protest coincided with Ashura, the commemoration observed by Shi'as for the death of Imam Hussein, the third imam of Shia's who was killed by the order of Umayyad Caliph Yazid I, protesters deliberately blended their political message with the Ashura's religious one in this protest. They alternated anti-government slogans with ancient cries of mourning for Imam Hussein.

"This is a month of blood. The dictator will fall" Protesters equated Ayatollah Khamenei with Yazid I, the Umayyad Caliph who ordered Imam Hussein's killing.
"Death to the dictator"
"Death to Khamenei"

See also
 Timeline of the 2009 Iranian election protests
 Politics and Government of Iran

References

External links
Five pictures of demonstrations from Spiegel.de – Descriptions are in German
Street fighting pictures by Fox News – Attention: The pictures are very disturbing!
Videos on BBC

Ashura Protests
2009 Iranian presidential election protests
Ashura
Ashura Protests
December 2009 events in Asia
Dirty wars
History of civil rights and liberties in Iran
Movements for civil rights
Nonviolent resistance movements
Police misconduct in Iran
Political riots
Protest-related deaths
Protests against results of elections
Protests in Iran